Paniyara is a constituency of the Uttar Pradesh Legislative Assembly covering the city of Paniyara in the Maharajganj district of Uttar Pradesh, India.

Paniyara is one of five assembly constituencies in the Maharajganj Lok Sabha constituency. Since 2008, this assembly constituency is numbered 319 amongst 403 constituencies.

Members of Legislative Assembly

Election results

2022

2017

References

External links
 

Assembly constituencies of Uttar Pradesh
Maharajganj district